The BL 7.5-inch gun Mk I was a British 45-calibre, medium-velocity, naval gun which entered service with the Royal Navy in 1905.

History 
This gun was only mounted on Devonshire class cruisers commissioned in 1905, and was quickly superseded by the 50-calibre 7.5-inch Mk II gun.

See also 
 List of naval guns

Notes

References

External links 

 Tony DiGiulian, British 7.5"/45 (19 cm) Mark I

Naval guns of the United Kingdom
World War I naval weapons of the United Kingdom
190 mm artillery